Halland Museum of Cultural History (Swedish: Hallands kulturhistoriska museum) is a museum of cultural history in Varberg, Sweden. The museum was formerly known as Varberg County Museum (Swedish: Länsmuseet Varberg). The name was changed in 2011.

The museum is situated in the Varberg Fortress. It  also consists of  Bexell Cottage  (Bexellska stugan),  Galtabäck boat museum (Båtmuseet i Galtabäcks hamn)  and Fågelboet,  the former home of the author August Bondeson (1854-1906).

The most important and famous exhibit at the museum is  Bocksten Man, the remains of a man murdered during the fourteenth century.

References

External links 
Länsmuseet Varberg website 

Varberg
History museums in Sweden
Museums in Halland County